The Boston Open is an annual badminton tournament held in Cambridge, Massachusetts just across the Charles River from Boston. It has become the leading regularly held tournament in the Eastern United States.

History 
The Boston Open was established in 1997 as regional tournament for Northeastern players, the first significant open badminton tournament in Massachusetts since the earlier New England Open which had been played from the mid 1930s to the late 1980s. When the tournament was created, the Rockwell Cage at the Massachusetts Institute of Technology (MIT) in Cambridge, Massachusetts was chosen as the location for the tournament. The Rockwell Cage is an athletic facility at MIT, and home of the university's basketball and volleyball teams. The Boston Open has been held there ever since. Over time the tournament began to develop and gain popularity. It would soon become one of the top tournaments in North America, attracting badminton players from around the world.

Sponsorship 
In order to operate the Boston Open relies upon aid from sponsors. The MIT Badminton Club has been the primary sponsor for the Boston Open since 1997. The club works hard every year to make sure the tournament runs smoothly. The MIT Badminton Club is partially responsible for getting the Boston Open to where it is today. In 2014 adidas became the official named sponsor of the tournament, helping the Boston Open gain even more recognition and further prove its significance. With the new sponsorship from adidas in 2014, the Boston Open was able to increase their total tournament prize money to $22,150.

Notable players 
Howard Bach is a professional Vietnamese-American badminton player. He annually partakes in the Boston Open and has managed to win the championship for the men's doubles twice. Howard Bach is also one of the few American badminton players to participate in the Olympics.

Previous winners

Open division

Senior division

2014 Prize Money

References

External links
Boston Open Official Site
2009 WILSON MIT BOSTON OPEN | Events | USA Badminton
MIT Badminton Club
2009 Tournament results

1997 establishments in Massachusetts
Annual sporting events in the United States
Badminton tournaments in the United States
History of Cambridge, Massachusetts
Recurring sporting events established in 1997
Sports competitions in Massachusetts
Sports in Cambridge, Massachusetts